Desmiphora rufocristata is a species of beetle in the family Cerambycidae. It was described by Melzer in 1935. It is known from Brazil.

References

Desmiphora
Beetles described in 1935